Clara Antoinette McCarty Wilt (1858–1929) was the first graduate of the University of Washington and the first woman superintendent of the Pierce County School District.

Early life

McCarty was born on February 12, 1858, in Steilacoom, Washington. She was born to Jonathan Warren and Ruth Jane Kincaid McCarty. Jonathan and Ruth were two of the original settlers of the town of Sumner, Washington. They were married on January 7, 1855, in the Sumner area. Clara was the second of five children: Charles C., Laura Candace, Mary Estelle, William W., and Frank Truman. In the years following their marriage, Jonathan and Ruth, along with Ruth's family moved to Fort Steilacoom when Sumner was threatened by Indians.  While in Fort Steilacoom, Ruth had Clara in 1858.

In 1859, Clara's family went back to their settlement to find it completely destroyed by the Indians. They started a new farm, and Clara's father worked as mailman servicing Seattle and other places around the area, as well as keeping up the farm. In 1869, when Clara reached her preteens, she and her family moved to Seattle so that she and her siblings could receive a better education. There, Clara's father worked in the meat business, continued his work as a mailman, and hauled coal from Lake Union to the bay.

Family
Clara married John Henry Wilt (1852–1907) on July 13, 1882. Together, they had one child, Clara May Wilt.

Accomplishments
Clara was a woman of many firsts. She is even recognized for purchasing the first typewriter in Pierce County.

University of Washington Graduate
In 1876, Clara Antoinette McCarty Wilt graduated from the Territorial University, now known as the University of Washington, at the age of 18. She was the first person to successfully graduate from the University, let alone the first woman graduate. She graduated with a bachelor's degree in science. At the time, the Territorial University was located in what is now downtown Seattle, wedged between 4th and 6th Avenues on the west and east and Union and Seneca Streets on the north and south. In 1861, the first University building had four floors, and thirty-five rooms. Tuition was twenty two dollars a quarter when Clara attended the University. After graduating from the University, Clara taught in various schools, and then she attended the University of California. In her honor, McCarty Hall, a dormitory on the current UW campus is named after her.

Superintendent of Pierce County Schools
On November 2, 1880, Clara was elected Superintendent of Pierce County Schools. With this achievement, she was the first Superintendent of Pierce County Schools, as well as being the first woman to hold office in the Washington Territory.

Later life and death
In her later years, Clara was very involved in her community, including working as a YMCA secretary, typing for the County Court, and acted as secretary in her church. She was also involved in her local historical society. She died on January 19, 1929, at 71 years of age.

References

Sources
"Descendants of Joseph Kincaid." Genealogy.Com. 2007. The Generations Network. 11 June 2008 <https://web.archive.org/web/20110606010632/http://www.genealogy.com/users/p/e/t/Jack-E-Peters-ii-2/FILE/0001text.txt>.
"Historic Timeline." Town of Steilacoom. 11 June 2008 <https://web.archive.org/web/20070731000717/http://www.townofsteilacoom.com/history/timeline.htm>.
"History of Sumner, WA." 2006. City of Sumner. 11 June 2008 <https://web.archive.org/web/20081226005221/http://www.ci.sumner.wa.us/Living/History.htm>.
"History." Welcome to the University of Washington. University of Washington. 11 June 2008 <https://web.archive.org/web/20080517080446/http://admit.washington.edu/files/PDFs/2005_Tour_Booklet.pdf>.
Krohn, Thirza. "Faculty and Students in the Early Years At the U." University of Washington: a Pictorial History. 20 November  2007. University of Washington. 11 June 2008 <http://www.washington.edu/home/historical/faculty.html>.
Krohn, Thirza. "Territorial University." University of Washington: a Pictorial History. 20 November  2007. University of Washington. 11 June 2008 <http://www.washington.edu/home/historical/territorial.html>.
Kueter, Vince. "Seattle Through the Years." The Seattle Times 13 November  2001. 11 June 2008 <http://seattletimes.nwsource.com/news/local/seattle_history/articles/timeline.html>.
Lange, Greg. "University of Washington Graduates First Person, a Woman, in July 1876." HistoryLink.Org. 5 November  1998. History Ink. 11 June 2008 <http://www.historylink.org/essays/output.cfm?file_id=222>.
Long, Priscilla. "Clara McCarty is Elected Superintendent of Pierce County Schools on November 2, 1880." HistoryLink.Org. 17 January  2003. History Ink. 11 June 2008 <http://www.historylink.org/essays/output.cfm?file_id=5061>.
"Origins." Town of Steilacoom. 11 June 2008 <https://web.archive.org/web/20070731000732/http://www.townofsteilacoom.com/history/origins.htm>.
"Our History." Town of Steilacoom. 11 June 2008 <http://webarchive.loc.gov/all/20051004080206/http://www.townofsteilacoom.com/history/index.htm>.
"Place Names." Town of Steilacoom. 11 June 2008 <https://web.archive.org/web/20070731000710/http://www.townofsteilacoom.com/history/names_places.htm>.
Ryan, Amy M. The Sumner Story. Sumner, WA: Sumner Historical Society, 1988.

Further reading
Ryan, Amy M. The Sumner Story. Sumner, WA: Sumner Historical Society, 1988.

External links

HistoryLink Essay: Clara McCarty is elected superintendent of Pierce County schools on November 2, 1880
University of Washington: A Pictorial History 
History of Sumner, WA
HistoryLink Essay: University of Washington graduates first person, a woman, in July 1876.

1858 births
1929 deaths
American women academics
Women of the Victorian era
University of Washington alumni
American pioneers
Women in Washington (state) politics
People from Steilacoom, Washington
People of the Washington Territory